Divine Grace and Human Agency: A Study of the Semi-Pelagian Controversy (1996) is a book about the semi-Pelagian controversy published by Mercer University Press. Its author is Rebecca Harden Weaver (born 1944), Professor Emerita of Church History at Union Presbyterian Seminary. The book got mainly favorable reviews.

References

1996 non-fiction books
Mercer University Press books
Pelagianism
Christian theology books
Books about ancient Christianity